Juniperus convallium is a species of conifer in the family Cupressaceae. It is a tree that is found only in the mountains of the Chinese provinces of Tibet, Qinghai, and Sichuan.

References

convallium
Flora of Tibet
Flora of Qinghai
Flora of Sichuan
Trees of China
Data deficient plants
Taxonomy articles created by Polbot